The men's triathlon is part of the Triathlon at the 2022 Commonwealth Games program. The competition was held on 29 July 2022 at Sutton Park, Birmingham.

Schedule
All times are British Summer Time (UTC+1)

Competition format
The race will once again be held over the "sprint distance" and consisted of  swimming,  road bicycling, and  road running.

Pre-race

Olympic silver and bronze medalists Alex Yee of England and Hayden Wilde of New Zealand enter as pre-race favourites, while reigning Commonwealth Games champion Henri Schoeman from South Africa, and 2018 silver medalist Jacob Birtwhistle of Australia also return.

Result

References

Triathlon at the 2022 Commonwealth Games